Old Belvedere Cricket Club was a cricket club in Dublin, Ireland, that played in the Leinster Senior League. The club was founded in 1950 and promoted to the Senior League in 1957.   
The club ceased to exist in 2012 when it withdrew from the league.

The club was established in 1950 by past pupils of Belvedere College. It was the only club in Ireland capable of hosting two matches simultaneously, as there were two full pitches on the ground. The ground at the Navan Road, known as the Cabra Oval, is owned by Belvedere College. The college continues to play cricket there.

Major honours
The team won the Leinster Senior League twice (1974 and 1976) and the Leinster Senior Cup four times (1964, 1965, 1966 and 1970).

International players

 Owen Butler
 Ray D. Daly
John J. McDevitt
John A. Prior
 Peter M. O'Reilly
 Alec O'Riordan
 Robin Waters

Notable coaches
Fr. Ger Brangan S.J. persuaded coaches to come over from the UK and run sessions in the nets in Jones Road. Among them were Charlie Hallows, Cec Pepper, Victor Cannings and Frank Worrell.

In later years coaching was continued on by Robin Waters.

Club records

200 runs and 20 wickets in a season: A. O'Riordan (17 times)
Hat tricks: A. O'Riordan (2)
Fifty wickets in a season: A. O'Riordan (4 times)
Five wickets in an innings: A. O'Riordan (65 times, including 9 with 5 in succession in 1964)
Best bowling analysis: D. Williams 8/15 Carlisle, Cabra, 1971
500 runs in a season: A. O'Riordan (5 times), best 678 (1965)
Centuries scored: A. O'Riordan, 9 centuries, highest 178 v Leinster Rathmines, 1969
Most successive matches: T. O'Brien: 124 
Best wicket keeping: P. Tynan 6 Catches v. Dublin University 1965; S. O'Gorman 5 Catches and 1 Stumping v. Phoenix 1984

References

External links

Detailed report on first Leinster Senior Cup win in 1964
Hall of Fame awards for Alec, Fintan and Robin
History and Officers of the Club
Alec O'Riordan helps defeat the West Indies in 1969 (see Famous Matches)
Location of Cabra Oval ground on the Navan Road in Dublin

Defunct cricket clubs in Ireland
1950 establishments in Ireland
Cricket clubs established in 1950